= J. J. Flikkie =

American politician

John J. Flikkie (1866–1944), was a member of the Minnesota House of Representatives in the early 1900s.

== Career ==
Flikkie was a member of the House of Representatives from 1917 to 1919. His election was contested, but upheld.
